Alessandro Guiccioli (5 March 1843 – 3 October 1922) was an Italian diplomat and politician. He was born in Venice. He was mayor of Rome from 1888 to 1889. He died in Rome, Kingdom of Italy.

References

1843 births
1922 deaths
Politicians from Venice
Members of the Senate of the Kingdom of Italy
Mayors of Rome
Ambassadors of Italy to Japan
19th-century Italian politicians
20th-century Italian politicians